Angelo Badini (23 September 1894 – 12 February 1921) was an Italian Argentine professional footballer who played as a midfielder.

Biography
He was born in Rosario, Santa Fe Argentina and had Argentine citizenship but could represent Italy internationally like his younger brother Emilio, thanks to his Bolognese parents.

Club career
Badini played for 5 seasons with Bologna F.C. 1909.

Personal life
Angelo Badini's older brother Emilio Badini and younger brothers Cesare Badini and Augusto Badini all played for Bologna. To distinguish them, Angelo was referred to as Badini I, Emilio as Badini II, Cesare as Badini III and Augusto as Badini IV.

Death and legacy
He died on 12 February 1921 from sepsis. Sometime later the Stadio Sterlino was named after him. His remains rests at the Certosa di Bologna.

References

External links
 Il Museo di Pignaca
Argentine players in Italy Rsssf.com
Statistics on Playerhistory
Statistics on once-onze.narod.ru

1894 births
1921 deaths
Italian footballers
Bologna F.C. 1909 players
S.P.A.L. players
Serie A players
People of Emilian descent
Association football midfielders
Deaths from sepsis
Infectious disease deaths in Emilia-Romagna
Footballers from Rosario, Santa Fe